CNDD may refer to:
 National Council for the Defense of Democracy, Burundi
 National Council for Democracy and Development, Guinea

See also:

 National Council for the Defense of Democracy–Forces for the Defense of Democracy (CNDD-FDD)